Mayflower is a steam tug built in Bristol in 1861 and now preserved by Bristol Museums Galleries & Archives. She is based in Bristol Harbour at M Shed (formerly Bristol Industrial Museum). She is the oldest Bristol-built ship afloat, and is believed to be the oldest surviving tug in the world.

Building
Mayflower was built by GK Stothert & Co, who were connected with the Bath-based engineering company Stothert & Pitt. A branch of the family came to Bristol to build railway locomotives (later to become the Avonside Engine Company). After 1852, a separate shipbuilding company was established which survived in business until the 1930s.

The tug has an iron hull. Her United Kingdom official number is 105412.

Service
Mayflower was built to work on the Gloucester and Sharpness Canal and in the River Severn, one of three tugs ordered after trials had shown they were much more efficient than horse-drawn boats. Altogether they cost £3,000.

Mayflower started work between Sharpness and Gloucester Docks, towing trains of small sailing vessels such as trows and ketches, and, after the new docks at Sharpness were completed in 1874, larger steamers one at a time. By the late 1890s she was the most seaworthy tug in the fleet, and she was altered to make her suitable for work in the Bristol Channel. Her original single-cylinder engine was replaced in 1899 with a vertical two-cylinder compound condensing engine supplied, along with a new boiler, funnel, propeller and shafting by W Sisson & Co of Gloucester for £940. The steering position, which had previously been abaft the funnel, was moved forward, and a waist high iron steering shelter added to give the skipper some comfort. She went back to work outside Sharpness, towing sailing vessels through the dangerous stretches of the Severn Estuary to the mouth of the river Wye and back again.

Around 1907, the Canal Company decided to compete on the River Severn upstream of Gloucester to Worcester. In 1909 Mayflower was again altered when the funnel was arranged to hinge down (counterbalanced with large weights which can still be seen) to enable her to pass under the fixed bridges on this stretch of water. She was now capable of working on every part of the navigation from Worcester to Chepstow, and because of this, became regarded as the training tug in the canal's fleet, which she continued to be until the end of her working life.

At the same time the bulwarks were cut away down most of each side and replaced with stanchions and chains; this reflected the increased barge traffic on the canal, allowing the crew to step onto laden barges easily.

In the late 1930s, a wooden wheelhouse replaced the steering shelter, and some time after this the bulwarks were replaced. In 1948 the British Waterways Board took over the canal and made efforts to modernise the tug fleet. All the tugs were either scrapped or had diesel engines installed, except Mayflower, as she was too old to be worth bothering with. She was given the job of 'mudding tug' – towing the mud hopper barges filled by the canal dredger to the discharge point. Sometimes she was needed to turn ships at Sharpness Docks and assist them in the entrance lock. In 1962–1963, when the winter was so cold that the canal froze and the diesel tugs had difficulty in working, Mayflower once again took on ship-towing work in the canal. Finally, British Waterways sold Mayflower for scrap in 1967.

Preservation
She was saved from being scrapped by Anthony H Barrett Great Wyrley, who at the time was setting out in his business career and regularly attended auction sales throughout the UK. Mayflower had been bought by an illegal auction ring which Barrett Great Wyrley had to join if he stood any chance of acquiring it. Barrett Great Wyrley who was the highest bidder in that 'ring' and he bought the tug for a sum of £400, borrowing the money to pay for her from his older cousin, George Billingham. A consortium was then formed to fund the purchase, and Barrett Great Wyrley was joined by Kevin Donaghy and Len Sanford, two Walsall engineers. All three men took a third share in Mayflower and agreed to share the expenses of keeping her moored at Gloucester Docks.

Barrett Great Wyrley, who was about 20 years old at the time, was already involved in the restoration of vintage Rolls-Royce cars, and he saw the importance of preserving Mayflower. He wrote to many people and organisations, including Prince Charles who was going through his investiture at the time, to find help in preserving the tug, but to no avail. In the late 1970s the two other investors pulled out after some vandals went aboard in the night and opened the seacocks, scuttling the tug. This event cost the consortium more than £1,400 to re-float the boat. Barrett Great Wyrley continued alone until 1981 when, because of a financial crisis, he decided he too must pull out and let someone else take over as custodian.

In 1981 Charles Phillips Auctioneers auctioned the tug from outside Barrett Great Wyrley's home at Sneyd Farm Essington. Bristol Museums & Art Gallery bought her and her towed back to the city where she was built.

Over the next six years Mayflower was restored to working order by a team of volunteers, and she steamed again in 1987. Early in 1988, she steamed back to Gloucester on a courtesy visit.

Mayflower regularly steams during the summer months carrying visitors on trips in Bristol Harbour. She marked her 150th anniversary in May 2011.

In May 2021 Mayflower was returned to service after her boiler was re-tubed.

References

External links

Mayflower at the Register of National Historic Ships

Steam tugs
Tugboats of the United Kingdom
Bristol Industrial Museum
1861 ships
Ships and vessels of the National Historic Fleet
Museum ships in the United Kingdom